Nosferatu is the fourth album by American heavy metal band Helstar, released by Metal Blade Records in November 1989. The first half of the album follows a storyline based on the Bram Stoker novel Dracula and includes audio samples of Frank Langella's performance in John Badham's film adaptation of Dracula. It was the last album recorded by the band before going on hiatus, until reforming in 1995.

Track listing

Personnel
James Rivera – vocals
Larry Barragan – guitar
André Corbin – guitar, keyboards
Jerry Abarca – bass, piano, keyboards
Frank Ferreira – drums

References

1989 albums
Metal Blade Records albums
Helstar albums
Works based on Dracula
Music based on novels
Vampires in music